Dichomeris is a genus of moths in the family Gelechiidae erected by Jacob Hübner in 1818.

Selected species
ligulella species group
Dichomeris ligulella Hübner, 1818
Dichomeris gausapa Hodges, 1986
acuminata species group
Dichomeris acuminatus (Staudinger, 1876)
Dichomeris nenia Hodges, 1986
condaliavorella species group
Dichomeris condaliavorella (Busck, 1900)
citrifoliella species group
Dichomeris blanchardorum Hodges, 1986
Dichomeris citrifoliella (Chambers, 1880)
Dichomeris carycina (Meyrick, 1914)
Dichomeris caryophragma (Meyrick, 1923)
Dichomeris diacnista (Meyrick, 1923)
marginella species group
Dichomeris marginella (Fabricius, 1781)
Dichomeris juniperella (Linnaeus, 1761)
solatrix species group
Dichomeris solatrix Hodges, 1986
hypochloa species group
Dichomeris hypochloa Walsingham, 1911
Dichomeris sacricola (Meyrick, 1922)
Dichomeris thanatopsis (Lower, 1901)
punctipennella species group
Dichomeris punctipennella (Clemens, 1860)
punctidiscella species group
Dichomeris punctidiscellus (Clemens, 1863)
Dichomeris diva Hodges, 1986
Dichomeris sylphe Hodges, 1986
Dichomeris empusa Hodges, 1986
Dichomeris indigna (Walsingham, 1892)
Dichomeris lypetica Walsingham, 1911
hirculella species group
Dichomeris hirculella Busck, 1909
Dichomeris caia Hodges, 1986
Dichomeris ardelia Hodges, 1986
Dichomeris tactica Meyrick, 1918
siren species group
Dichomeris siren Hodges, 1986
Dichomeris latescens (Walsingham, 1911)
Dichomeris ceratomoxantha (Meyrick, 1929)
flavocostella species group
Dichomeris flavocostella (Clemens, 1860)
Dichomeris fistuca Hodges, 1986
inversella species group
Dichomeris inversella (Zeller, 1873)
Dichomeris kimballi Hodges, 1986
ventrella species group
Dichomeris ventrellus (Fitch, 1854)
Dichomeris georgiella (Walker, 1866)
Dichomeris vacciniella Busck, 1915
Dichomeris bipunctellus (Walsingham, 1882)
Dichomeris atomogypsa (Meyrick, 1932)
Dichomeris sparsellus (Christoph, 1882)
Dichomeris tostella Stringer, 1930
setosella species group
Dichomeris setosella (Clemens, 1860)
Dichomeris vindex Hodges, 1986
Dichomeris mulsa Hodges, 1986
Dichomeris mica Hodges, 1986
Dichomeris aglaia Hodges, 1986
Dichomeris delotella Busck, 1909
Dichomeris gleba Hodges, 1986
Dichomeris alphito Hodges, 1986
Dichomeris laetitia Hodges, 1986
Dichomeris stipendiaria (Braun, 1925)
Dichomeris bilobella (Zeller, 1873)
Dichomeris aleatrix Hodges, 1986
Dichomeris copa Hodges, 1986
Dichomeris scrutaria Hodges, 1986
Dichomeris furia Hodges, 1986
Dichomeris purpureofusca (Walsingham, 1882)
Dichomeris nonstrigella (Chambers, 1878)
Dichomeris ochripalpella (Zeller, 1873)
Dichomeris achne Hodges, 1986
Dichomeris inserrata (Walsingham, 1882)
Dichomeris pelta Hodges, 1986
Dichomeris bolize Hodges, 1986
Dichomeris legnotoa Hodges, 1986
Dichomeris illusio Hodges, 1986
Dichomeris mimesis Hodges, 1986
Dichomeris serrativittella (Zeller, 1873)
Dichomeris xanthoa Hodges, 1986
Dichomeris isa Hodges, 1986
Dichomeris simulata Hodges, 1986
Dichomeris imitata Hodges, 1986
Dichomeris barnesiella (Busck, 1907)
Dichomeris simpliciella (Busck, 1904)
Dichomeris baxa Hodges, 1986
Dichomeris gnoma Hodges, 1986
Dichomeris washingtoniella (Busck, 1906)
Dichomeris levisella (Fyles, 1904)
Dichomeris leuconotella (Busck, 1904)
Dichomeris mercatrix Hodges, 1986
Dichomeris euprepes Hodges, 1986
Dichomeris juncidella (Clemens, 1860)
glenni species group
Dichomeris glenni Clarke, 1947
Dichomeris acritopa Meyrick, 1935
Dichomeris acrochlora (Meyrick, 1905)
costarufoella species group
Dichomeris costarufoella (Chambers, 1874)
Dichomeris agonia Hodges, 1986
Dichomeris offula Hodges, 1986
Dichomeris crepida Hodges, 1986
Dichomeris melanophylla (Turner, 1919)
Dichomeris chlorophracta Meyrick, 1921
heriguronis species group
Dichomeris heriguronis (Matsumura, 1931)
sybilla species group
Dichomeris sybilla Hodges, 1986
Acanthophila species group (often treated as a valid genus)
unplaced to species group
Dichomeris abscessella (Walker, 1863)
Dichomeris achlyodes (Meyrick, 1904)
Dichomeris acmodeta (Meyrick, 1931)
Dichomeris acratopa (Meyrick, 1926)
Dichomeris acrochlora (Meyrick, 1905)
Dichomeris acrogypsa Turner, 1919
Dichomeris acrolychna Meyrick, 1922
Dichomeris aculata Park, 2001
Dichomeris adactella (Walker, 1864)
Dichomeris adelocentra Meyrick, 1920
Dichomeris aenigmatica (Clarke, 1962)
Dichomeris aequata Meyrick, 1914
Dichomeris aestuosa (Meyrick, 1913)
Dichomeris agathopa Meyrick, 1921
Dichomeris agorastis (Meyrick, 1931)
Dichomeris albiscripta (Meyrick, 1914)
Dichomeris albula Park & Hodges, 1995
Dichomeris allantopa Meyrick, 1934
Dichomeris alogista Meyrick, 1935
Dichomeris amauropis (Meyrick, 1923)
Dichomeris amblopis (Janse, 1954)
Dichomeris amblychroa (Janse, 1954)
Dichomeris amblystola (Janse, 1954)
Dichomeris amorpha (Meyrick, 1937)
Dichomeris amphichlora (Meyrick, 1923)
Dichomeris amphicoma Meyrick, 1912
Dichomeris amphicosma (Meyrick, 1930)
Dichomeris ampliata Meyrick, 1913
Dichomeris ampycota (Meyrick, 1913)
Dichomeris analoxa (Meyrick, 1911)
Dichomeris angulata Park & Hodges, 1995
Dichomeris anisacuminata Li & Zheng, 1996
Dichomeris anisospila Meyrick, 1934
Dichomeris anomala (Janse, 1960)
Dichomeris anticrates (Meyrick, 1931)
Dichomeris antiloxa (Meyrick, 1931)
Dichomeris antisticha Meyrick, 1926
Dichomeris antisticta (Meyrick, 1929)
Dichomeris antizella Viette, 1986
Dichomeris antizyga Meyrick, 1913
Dichomeris aomoriensis Park & Hodges, 1995
Dichomeris aphanopa Meyrick, 1921
Dichomeris apicispina Li & Zheng, 1996
Dichomeris aplectodes (Janse, 1960)
Dichomeris apludellus (Lederer, 1869)
Dichomeris aprica (Meyrick, 1913)
Dichomeris ardesiella Walsingham, 1911
Dichomeris argentaria Meyrick, 1913
Dichomeris argentenigera Li, Zhen & Kendrick, 2010
Dichomeris argentinellus (Berg, 1885)
Dichomeris argigastra Walsingham, 1911
Dichomeris arotrosema Walsingham, 1911
Dichomeris arquata Li, Zhen & Mey, 2013
Dichomeris asaphocosma (Meyrick, 1934)
Dichomeris asodes Meyrick, 1939
Dichomeris asteropis Meyrick, 1921
Dichomeris atactodes (Janse, 1954)
Dichomeris atricornis (Meyrick, 1934)
Dichomeris atriguttata (Meyrick, 1931)
Dichomeris attenta Meyrick, 1921
Dichomeris aulotoma Meyrick, 1917
Dichomeris aurisulcata (Meyrick, 1922)
Dichomeris autometra (Meyrick, 1934)
Dichomeris autophanta (Meyrick, 1921)
Dichomeris badiolineariella Ponomarenko & Ueda, 2004
Dichomeris balioella Ponomarenko & Ueda, 2004
Dichomeris baccata Meyrick, 1923
Dichomeris barathrodes (Meyrick, 1909)
Dichomeris barbella (Denis & Schiffermüller, 1775)
Dichomeris barymochla (Meyrick, 1935)
Dichomeris bifurca Li & Zheng, 1996
Dichomeris biplagata Meyrick, 1931
Dichomeris bisignellus (Snellen, 1885)
Dichomeris bispotalis Walia & Wadhawan, 2004
Dichomeris bitinctella (Walker, 1864)
Dichomeris bodenheimeri (Rebel, 1926)
Dichomeris bomiensis Li & Zheng, 1996
Dichomeris brachygrapha Meyrick, 1920
Dichomeris brachymetra Meyrick, 1923
Dichomeris brachyptila Meyrick, 1916
Dichomeris brevicornuta Li, Zhen & Mey, 2013
Dichomeris bucinaria Park, 1996
Dichomeris bulawskii Ponomarenko & Park, 1996
Dichomeris byrsoxantha (Meyrick, 1918)
Dichomeris cachrydias Meyrick, 1914
Dichomeris caerulescens (Meyrick, 1913)
Dichomeris capillata (Walsingham, 1911)
Dichomeris capnites (Meyrick, 1904)
Dichomeris carinella Walsingham, 1911
Dichomeris caryoplecta (Meyrick, 1930)
Dichomeris castellana (Schmidt, 1941)
Dichomeris caustonota (Meyrick, 1914)
Dichomeris cellaria (Meyrick, 1913)
Dichomeris centracma (Meyrick, 1923)
Dichomeris ceponoma Meyrick, 1918
Dichomeris ceramoxantha (Meyrick, 1929)
Dichomeris chalcophaea Meyrick, 1921
Dichomeris chalinopis (Meyrick, 1935)
Dichomeris chalybitis (Meyrick, 1920)
Dichomeris charonaea (Meyrick, 1913)
Dichomeris chartaria (Meyrick, 1913)
Dichomeris chinganella (Christoph, 1882)
Dichomeris chlanidota (Meyrick, 1927)
Dichomeris christophi Ponomarenko & Mey, 2002
Dichomeris cinctella (Walker, 1864)
Dichomeris cinnabarina (Meyrick, 1923)
Dichomeris cinnamicostella (Zeller, 1877)
Dichomeris cirrhostola Turner, 1919
Dichomeris cisti (Staudinger, 1859)
Dichomeris citharista (Meyrick, 1913)
Dichomeris clarescens Meyrick, 1913
Dichomeris claviculata (Meyrick, 1909)
Dichomeris cocta (Meyrick, 1913)
Dichomeris coenulenta (Meyrick, 1927)
Dichomeris collina (Meyrick, 1914)
Dichomeris concinnalis (Feisthamel, 1839)
Dichomeris conclusa (Meyrick, 1918)
Dichomeris condylodes (Meyrick, 1921)
Dichomeris consertellus (Christoph, 1882)
Dichomeris contentella (Walker, 1864)
Dichomeris contrita (Meyrick, 1922)
Dichomeris corniculata (Meyrick, 1913)
Dichomeris costalis Busck, 1914
Dichomeris cotifera Meyrick, 1913
Dichomeris crambaleas (Meyrick, 1913)
Dichomeris craspedotis (Meyrick, 1937)
Dichomeris crepitatrix Meyrick, 1913
Dichomeris crossospila Meyrick, 1933
Dichomeris cuprea Li & Zheng, 1996
Dichomeris cuspis Park, 1994
Dichomeris cyanoneura (Meyrick, 1922)
Dichomeris cyclospila (Meyrick, 1918)
Dichomeris cymatodes (Meyrick, 1916)
Dichomeris cymotrocha (Meyrick, 1913)
Dichomeris cyprophanes (Meyrick, 1918)
Dichomeris davisi Park & Hodges, 1995
Dichomeris deceptella (Snellen, 1903)
Dichomeris decusella (Walker, 1864)
Dichomeris deltaspis (Meyrick, 1905)
Dichomeris deltoxyla (Meyrick, 1934)
Dichomeris dentata Li, Zhen & Mey, 2013
Dichomeris designatella (Walker, 1864)
Dichomeris derasella (Denis & Schiffermüller, 1775)
Dichomeris diacrita (Diakonoff, [1968])
Dichomeris dicausta (Meyrick, 1913)
Dichomeris diffurca Li & Zheng, 1996
Dichomeris dignella Walsingham, 1911
Dichomeris directa (Meyrick, 1912)
Dichomeris dolichaula Meyrick, 1931
Dichomeris doxarcha (Meyrick, 1916)
Dichomeris dryinodes (Lower, 1897)
Dichomeris dysnotata (Janse, 1954)
Dichomeris dysorata Turner, 1919
Dichomeris ebenosella (Viette, 1968)
Dichomeris elegans Park, 2001
Dichomeris ellipsias Meyrick, 1922
Dichomeris elliptica (Forbes, 1931)
Dichomeris enoptrias (Meyrick, 1911)
Dichomeris eosella (Viette, 1956)
Dichomeris eridantis (Meyrick, 1907)
Dichomeris erixantha (Meyrick, 1914)
Dichomeris eucomopa Meyrick, 1939
Dichomeris euparypha (Meyrick, 1922)
Dichomeris eurynotus (Walsingham, 1897)
Dichomeris eustacta Meyrick, 1921
Dichomeris evitata Walsingham, 1911
Dichomeris exallacta (Meyrick, 1926)
Dichomeris excavata Busck, 1914
Dichomeris excepta Meyrick, 1914
Dichomeris excoriata Meyrick, 1913
Dichomeris explicata (Meyrick, 1929)
Dichomeris exsecta Meyrick, 1927
Dichomeris externella (Zeller, 1852)
Dichomeris famosa (Meyrick, 1914)
Dichomeris famulata Meyrick, 1914
Dichomeris fareasta Park, 1994
Dichomeris ferrata Meyrick, 1913
Dichomeris ferrogra Li & Wang, 1997
Dichomeris ferruginosa Meyrick, 1913
Dichomeris festa (Meyrick, 1921)
Dichomeris fida Meyrick, 1923
Dichomeris finitima (Meyrick, 1921)
Dichomeris fluctuans (Meyrick, 1923)
Dichomeris fluitans Meyrick, 1920
Dichomeris formulata (Meyrick, 1922)
Dichomeris fracticostella (Walsingham, 1891)
Dichomeris frenigera (Meyrick, 1913)
Dichomeris fulvicilia (Meyrick, 1922)
Dichomeris fungifera (Meyrick, 1913)
Dichomeris furvellus (Zeller, 1852)
Dichomeris fusca Park & Hodges, 1995
Dichomeris fuscahopa Li & Zheng, 1996
Dichomeris fuscalis Park & Hodges, 1995
Dichomeris fuscanella (Caradja, 1920)
Dichomeris fuscodelta Walia & Wadhawan, 2004
Dichomeris fuscusitis Li & Zheng, 1996
Dichomeris gansuensis Li & Zheng, 1996
Dichomeris geochrota (Meyrick, 1914)
Dichomeris gnophrina (Felder & Rogenhofer, 1875)
Dichomeris gorgopa (Meyrick, 1918)
Dichomeris griseostola (Janse, 1960)
Dichomeris griseola (Janse, 1960)
Dichomeris habrochitona Walsingham, 1911
Dichomeris hamata (Janse, 1954)
Dichomeris hamulifera Li, Zhen & Kendrick, 2010
Dichomeris hansi Walia & Wadhawan, 2004
Dichomeris haplopa (Janse, 1960)
Dichomeris harmonias Meyrick, 1922
Dichomeris helianthemi (Walsingham, 1903)
Dichomeris hemeropa (Meyrick, 1923)
Dichomeris hemichrysella (Walker, 1863)
Dichomeris hercogramma (Meyrick, 1921)
Dichomeris heteracma Meyrick, 1923
Dichomeris hexasticta Walsingham, 1911
Dichomeris hodgesi Li & Zheng, 1996
Dichomeris holomela (Lower, 1897)
Dichomeris hoplocrates (Meyrick, 1932)
Dichomeris hortulana (Meyrick, 1918)
Dichomeris homaloxesta (Meyrick, 1921)
Dichomeris horiodes Meyrick, 1923
Dichomeris horocompsa Meyrick, 1933
Dichomeris horoglypta Meyrick, 1932
Dichomeris hylurga Meyrick, 1921
Dichomeris ignorata Meyrick, 1921
Dichomeris illicita (Meyrick, 1929)
Dichomeris illucescens (Meyrick, 1918)
Dichomeris imbricata Meyrick, 1913
Dichomeris immerita (Meyrick, 1913)
Dichomeris impigra Meyrick, 1913
Dichomeris inclusa (Meyrick, 1927)
Dichomeris indignus (Walsingham, [1892])
Dichomeris indiserta Meyrick, 1926
Dichomeris ingloria Meyrick, 1923
Dichomeris inspiciens (Meyrick, 1931)
Dichomeris instans Meyrick, 1923
Dichomeris intensa Meyrick, 1913
Dichomeris intentella (Walker, 1864)
Dichomeris introspiciens (Meyrick, 1926)
Dichomeris iodorus (Meyrick, 1904)
Dichomeris ironica (Meyrick, 1909)
Dichomeris isoclera (Meyrick, 1913)
Dichomeris issikii (Okada, 1961)
Dichomeris jiangxiensis Li & Zheng, 1996
Dichomeris jugata Walsingham, 1911
Dichomeris junisonensis Matsumura, 1931
Dichomeris kalesarensis Walia & Wadhawan, 2004
Dichomeris lamprostoma (Zeller, 1847)
Dichomeris lativalvata Li & Zheng, 1996
Dichomeris latipalpis (Walsingham, 1881)
Dichomeris leontovitchi (Ghesquière, 1940)
Dichomeris leptosaris Meyrick, 1932
Dichomeris lespedezae Park, 1994
Dichomeris leucocosma (Meyrick, 1916)
Dichomeris leucostena Walsingham, 1911
Dichomeris leucothicta Meyrick, 1919
Dichomeris levigata (Meyrick, 1913)
Dichomeris ligulacea Li, Zhen & Mey, 2013
Dichomeris ligyra (Meyrick, 1913)
Dichomeris limbipunctellus (Staudinger, 1859)
Dichomeris limosellus (Schläger, 1849)
Dichomeris linealis Park & Hodges, 1995
Dichomeris lissota (Meyrick, 1913)
Dichomeris litoxyla Meyrick, 1937
Dichomeris lividula Park & Hodges, 1995
Dichomeris loxonoma Meyrick, 1937
Dichomeris loxospila (Meyrick, 1932)
Dichomeris lucrifuga Meyrick, 1923
Dichomeris lupata (Meyrick, 1913)
Dichomeris lushanae Park & Hodges, 1995
Dichomeris lutea Park & Hodges, 1995
Dichomeris lutilinea Ponomarenko & Park, 1996
Dichomeris lutivittata Meyrick, 1921
Dichomeris lygropa (Lower, 1903)
Dichomeris macrosphena (Meyrick, 1913)
Dichomeris macroxyla (Meyrick, 1913)
Dichomeris malachias (Meyrick, 1913)
Dichomeris malacodes (Meyrick, 1910)
Dichomeris malthacopa (Meyrick, 1922)
Dichomeris manellus (Möschler, 1890)
Dichomeris manticopodina Li & Zheng, 1996
Dichomeris marginata (Walsingham, 1891)
Dichomeris matsumurai Ponomarenko & Ueda, 2004
Dichomeris marmoratus (Walsingham, 1891)
Dichomeris maturata (Meyrick, 1921)
Dichomeris melanortha Meyrick, 1929
Dichomeris melanosoma (Meyrick, 1920)
Dichomeris melanota Walsingham, 1911
Dichomeris melichrous (Meyrick, 1904)
Dichomeris melitura (Meyrick, 1916)
Dichomeris memnonia (Meyrick, 1913)
Dichomeris mengdana Li & Zheng, 1997
Dichomeris menglana Li & Zheng, 1996
Dichomeris meridionella (Walsingham, 1881)
Dichomeris mesoctenis Meyrick, 1921
Dichomeris mesoglena Meyrick, 1923
Dichomeris metatoxa (Meyrick, 1935)
Dichomeris metrodes Meyrick, 1913
Dichomeris metuens Meyrick, 1932
Dichomeris microdoxa (Meyrick, 1932)
Dichomeris microphanta (Meyrick, 1921)
Dichomeris microsphena Meyrick, 1921
Dichomeris millotella Viette, 1956
Dichomeris miltophragma Meyrick, 1922
Dichomeris mistipalpis (Walsingham, 1911)
Dichomeris minutia Park, 1994
Dichomeris mitteri Park, 1994
Dichomeris mochlopis (Meyrick, 1923)
Dichomeris molybdea (Janse, 1954)
Dichomeris molybdoterma Meyrick, 1933
Dichomeris monorbella Viette, 1988
Dichomeris moriutii Ponomarenko & Ueda, 2004
Dichomeris monococca (Meyrick, 1921)
Dichomeris nessica Walsingham, 1911
Dichomeris ningshanensis Li & Zheng, 1996
Dichomeris nitiellus (Constantini, 1922)
Dichomeris nivalis Li & Zheng, 1996
Dichomeris obsepta (Meyrick, 1935)
Dichomeris oceanis Meyrick, 1920
Dichomeris ochreata Park & Hodges, 1995
Dichomeris ochreofimbriella (Viette, 1968)
Dichomeris ochroxesta (Meyrick, 1921)
Dichomeris ochthophora Meyrick, 1936
Dichomeris oenombra (Meyrick, 1914)
Dichomeris okadai (Moriuti, 1982)
Dichomeris oleata Meyrick, 1913
Dichomeris olivescens Meyrick, 1913
Dichomeris opalina (Ghesquière, 1940)
Dichomeris opsonoma Meyrick, 1914
Dichomeris opsorrhoa (Meyrick, 1929)
Dichomeris orientis Park & Hodges, 1995
Dichomeris orthacma Meyrick, 1926
Dichomeris ostensella (Walker, 1864)
Dichomeris ostracodes Meyrick, 1916
Dichomeris oxycarpa (Meyrick, 1935)
Dichomeris oxygrapha (Meyrick, 1913)
Dichomeris paenitens (Meyrick, 1923)
Dichomeris pammiges (Ghesquière, 1940)
Dichomeris parallelosa Park & Ponomarenko, 1998
Dichomeris parochroma (Janse, 1954)
Dichomeris parvisexafurca Li, Zhen & Kendrick, 2010
Dichomeris paulianella Viette, 1956
Dichomeris paulidigitata Li, Zhen & Mey, 2013
Dichomeris pectinella (Forbes, 1931)
Dichomeris pelitis (Meyrick, 1913)
Dichomeris pelocnista (Meyrick, 1939)
Dichomeris percnacma (Meyrick, 1923)
Dichomeris percnopolis Walsingham, 1911
Dichomeris peristylis (Meyrick, 1904)
Dichomeris permundella (Walker, 1864)
Dichomeris petalodes Meyrick, 1934
Dichomeris phaeosarca (Meyrick, 1931)
Dichomeris phaeostrota (Meyrick, 1923)
Dichomeris phaeothina (Ghesquière, 1940)
Dichomeris phoenogramma (Meyrick, 1930)
Dichomeris physeta (Meyrick, 1913)
Dichomeris physocoma Meyrick, 1926
Dichomeris piperatus (Walsingham, [1892])
Dichomeris pladarota Meyrick, 1921
Dichomeris plasticus (Meyrick, 1904)
Dichomeris planata (Meyrick, 1910)
Dichomeris pleuroleuca Turner, 1919
Dichomeris pleuropa (Meyrick, 1921)
Dichomeris pleurophaea (Turner, 1919)
Dichomeris plexigramma Meyrick, 1922
Dichomeris plumbosa (Meyrick, 1913)
Dichomeris polyaema (Meyrick, 1923)
Dichomeris polygnampta (Meyrick, 1938)
Dichomeris polygona Li & Zheng, 1996
Dichomeris polypunctata Park, 1994
Dichomeris porphyrogramma (Meyrick, 1914)
Dichomeris praealbescens (Meyrick, 1922)
Dichomeris praevacua Meyrick, 1922
Dichomeris prensans Meyrick, 1922
Dichomeris procrossa (Meyrick, 1913)
Dichomeris procyphodes Meyrick, 1922
Dichomeris pseudodeltaspis Ponomarenko & Ueda, 2004
Dichomeris pseudometra (Meyrick, 1913)
Dichomeris pseudomorpha (Janse, 1954)
Dichomeris ptilocompa Meyrick, 1922
Dichomeris ptychosema Meyrick, 1913
Dichomeris punctatella (Walker, 1864)
Dichomeris pyretodes (Meyrick, 1914)
Dichomeris pyrrhitis (Meyrick, 1911)
Dichomeris pyrrhopis (Meyrick, 1922)
Dichomeris pyrrhoschista (Meyrick, 1934)
Dichomeris qingchengshanensis Li & Zheng, 1996
Dichomeris quadrata Park & Ponomarenko, 1998
Dichomeris quadratipalpa Li & Zheng, 1996
Dichomeris quadrifurca Li & Zheng, 1996
Dichomeris quadrifurcata (Janse, 1954)
Dichomeris quercicola Meyrick, 1921
Dichomeris rasilella (Herrich-Schäffer, 1854)
Dichomeris rectifascia Li & Zheng, 1997
Dichomeris reducta (Janse, 1951)
Dichomeris renascens Walsingham, 1911
Dichomeris resignata Meyrick, 1929
Dichomeris retracta (Meyrick, 1922)
Dichomeris rhizogramma (Meyrick, 1923)
Dichomeris rufusella Ponomarenko & Ueda, 2004
Dichomeris rhodophaea Meyrick, 1920
Dichomeris rubidula (Meyrick, 1913)
Dichomeris rubiginosella (Walker, 1864)
Dichomeris rurigena (Meyrick, 1914)
Dichomeris sandycitis (Meyrick, 1907)
Dichomeris santarosensis Hodges, 1985
Dichomeris saturata Meyrick, 1923
Dichomeris scenites (Meyrick, 1909)
Dichomeris scepticopis Meyrick, 1939
Dichomeris sciastes Walsingham, 1911
Dichomeris sciodora Meyrick, 1922
Dichomeris sciritis (Meyrick, 1918)
Dichomeris semicuprata (Meyrick, 1922)
Dichomeris seminata (Meyrick, 1911)
Dichomeris semnias (Meyrick, 1926)
Dichomeris serena (Meyrick, 1909)
Dichomeris sevectella (Walker, 1864)
Dichomeris sexafurca Li & Zheng, 1996
Dichomeris shenae Li & Zheng, 1996
Dichomeris sicaellus Pathania & Rose, 2003
Dichomeris sicasymmetria Walia & Wadhawan, 2004
Dichomeris simaoensis Li & Wang, 1997
Dichomeris siranta (Meyrick, 1913)
Dichomeris skukuzae (Janse, 1954)
Dichomeris specularis (Meyrick, 1918)
Dichomeris sphyrocopa (Meyrick, 1918)
Dichomeris spicans Li & Zheng, 1996
Dichomeris spuracuminata Li & Zheng, 1996
Dichomeris squalens Meyrick, 1914
Dichomeris stasimopa Meyrick, 1937
Dichomeris straminis (Walsingham, 1881)
Dichomeris stratellus (Walsingham, 1897)
Dichomeris stratigera Meyrick, 1922
Dichomeris strictella Park, 1994
Dichomeris stromatias Meyrick, 1918
Dichomeris stygnota (Walsingham, 1911)
Dichomeris subdentata Meyrick, 1922
Dichomeris subiridescens (Janse, 1954)
Dichomeris substratella Walsingham, 1911
Dichomeris summata Meyrick, 1913
Dichomeris sumptella (Walker, 1864)
Dichomeris sutschanellus (Caradja, 1926)
Dichomeris symmetrica Park & Hodges, 1995
Dichomeris synclepta (Meyrick, 1938)
Dichomeris syndyas Meyrick, 1926
Dichomeris synergastis Ponomarenko & Park, 1996
Dichomeris syngrapta (Meyrick, 1921)
Dichomeris syringota (Meyrick, 1926)
Dichomeris taiwana Park & Hodges, 1995
Dichomeris tapinostola (Janse, 1954)
Dichomeris tenextrema Li, Zhen & Mey, 2013
Dichomeris tepens (Meyrick, 1923)
Dichomeris tephrodes (Meyrick, 1909)
Dichomeris tephroxesta (Meyrick, 1931)
Dichomeris terracocta (Walsingham, 1911)
Dichomeris tersa Li & Zheng, 1996
Dichomeris testudinata Meyrick, 1934
Dichomeris tetraschema (Meyrick, 1931)
Dichomeris thalamopa Meyrick, 1922
Dichomeris thalpodes Meyrick, 1922
Dichomeris themelia (Meyrick, 1913)
Dichomeris thermodryas Meyrick, 1923
Dichomeris thermophaea (Meyrick, 1923)
Dichomeris thrasynta (Meyrick, 1914)
Dichomeris thrypsandra (Meyrick, 1923)
Dichomeris thyrsicola (Meyrick, 1913)
Dichomeris tongoborella (Viette, 1958)
Dichomeris torrefacta (Meyrick, 1914)
Dichomeris torrescens (Meyrick, 1921)
Dichomeris toxolyca (Meyrick, 1934)
Dichomeris traumatias (Meyrick, 1923)
Dichomeris tridentata (Janse, 1954)
Dichomeris trilobella Park & Hodges, 1995
Dichomeris triplagella (Walker, 1864)
Dichomeris trisignella (Janse, 1960)
Dichomeris trissoxantha (Meyrick, 1922)
Dichomeris tristicta Busck, 1914
Dichomeris turgida (Meyrick, 1918)
Dichomeris turrita (Meyrick, 1914)
Dichomeris umbricata Meyrick, 1934
Dichomeris uranopis (Meyrick, 1894)
Dichomeris ustalella (Fabricius, 1794)
Dichomeris vadonella Viette, 1955
Dichomeris varifurca Li & Zheng, 1996
Dichomeris varronia Busck, 1913
Dichomeris ventosa Meyrick, 1913
Dichomeris ventriprojecta Li, Zhen & Mey, 2013
Dichomeris vernariella Bidzilya, 1998
Dichomeris versicolorella (Walker, 1864)
Dichomeris vetustella (Walker, 1864)
Dichomeris vigilans (Meyrick, 1914)
Dichomeris violacula Li & Zheng, 1996
Dichomeris viridella (Snellen, 1901)
Dichomeris viridescens (Meyrick, 1918)
Dichomeris wuyiensis Li & Zheng, 1996
Dichomeris xanthodeta Meyrick, 1913
Dichomeris xanthophylla (Janse, 1963)
Dichomeris xeresella (Viette, 1956)
Dichomeris xerodes Walsingham, 1911
Dichomeris xestobyrsa Meyrick, 1921
Dichomeris xuthochyta (Turner, 1919)
Dichomeris xuthostola Walsingham, 1911
Dichomeris yanagawanus Matsumura, 1931
Dichomeris yuebana Li & Zheng, 1996
Dichomeris yunnanensis Li & Zheng, 1996
Dichomeris zomias Meyrick, 1914
Dichomeris zonaea (Meyrick, 1921)
Dichomeris zonata Li & Wang, 1997
Dichomeris zygophorus (Meyrick, 1904)
Dichomeris zymotella Viette, 1956

Status unclear
Dichomeris fuliginella (Costa, 1836), described as Rhinosia fuliginella from Italy.

References

 
 Li, H.-H.; Zheng, Z. M. & Wang, H. J. (1997). "Description of seven new species of the genus Dichomeris Hübner from China (Lepidoptera: Gelechiidae)". Entomologia Sinica. 4 (3): 220–230.
 
 Liu, Y.-q. & Qian, F.-J. (1994). "A new species of the genus Dichomeris injurious to China. (Lepidoptera: Gelechiidae)". Entomologia Sinica. 1 (4): 297–300.
 Park, K. T. (2001). "Two new species of Dichomeris (Lepidoptera: Gelechiidae) from Taiwan". Insecta Koreana 18 (4): 307–310.
 Ponomarenko, M. G. & Ueda, T. (2004). "New species of the genus Dichomeris Hübner (Lepidoptera: Gelechiidae) from Thailand". Transactions of the Lepidopterical Society of Japan. 55 (3): 147–159.

External links
 
 
 

 
Moth genera
Taxa named by Jacob Hübner